Tatarsky Sukhoy Izyak (Tatar Qoro İźäge) is a rural locality (a selo) in Pokrovsky Selsoviet, Fyodorovsky District, Bashkortostan, Russia. The population was 155 as of 2010. There is 1 street.

Geography 
Tatarsky Sukhoy Izyak is located 19 km northwest of Fyodorovka (the district's administrative centre) by road. Russky Sukhoy Izyak is the nearest rural locality.

References 

Rural localities in Fyodorovsky District